"Prod by Bloc" (released on streaming platforms as "Produced by Blocboy") is a song by American rapper BlocBoy JB. It was released as a standalone single on April 17, 2018.

Background 
The song is the first song that BlocBoy JB has ever produced. He spoke about the making of the track in an interview with The Fader.

Music video 
The music video was released on April 17, 2018, along with the single. The video features BlocBoy and his friends dancing with pots and pans.

Reception 
Peter A. Berry of XXL called the video "energetic".

Critical reception 
The track received generally positive reviews. Seamus Fay of Lyrical Lemonade called the track "a banger in every sense of the word". Liam of Elevator called the track an "anthem", and said it was "one of BlocBoy's strongest efforts yet".

References 

2018 songs
BlocBoy JB songs
2018 singles